Choi Bo-min (born 8 July 1984) is a South Korean compound archer and a former recurve archer.

She began training in archery in 1993 and made her international debut in 2002. In 2007 World Archery Championships, she won the gold medal in recurve women's team event.

She won two gold medals at the 2014 Asian Games in the women's individual event and women's team event alongside Kim Yun-hee and Seok Ji-hyun. She won another gold medal at the 2018 Asian Games in the women's team event alongside So Chae-won and Song Yun-soo.

She won bronze medals at the 2015 World Archery Championships in the women's team event and at the 2017 World Archery Championships in the women's team event.

References

1984 births
Living people
South Korean female archers
Asian Games medalists in archery
Archers at the 2018 Asian Games
Archers at the 2014 Asian Games
Medalists at the 2014 Asian Games
Medalists at the 2018 Asian Games
Asian Games gold medalists for South Korea
World Archery Championships medalists
21st-century South Korean women